Deurali is a Village Development Committee in Kaski District of the Gandaki province of north-central Nepal. At the time of the 1991 Nepal census, it had a population of 2,882. The base camp of Mount Machapuchare is situated at a 6 hours uphill trek from the village.

Being the furthest human-settled village en route to the Machapuchare base camp, Deurali falls in an avalanche-prone region with the most recent incident of human casualty reported on January 17, 2020.

References

External links
UN map of the municipalities of Kaski District

Populated places in Kaski District